Geoffery S. Loomis (born December 22, 1970) is an American college baseball coach and former infielder. Loomis is the head coach of the Portland Pilots baseball team.

Amateur career
Loomis attended Oregon City High School in Oregon City, Oregon. Loomis played for the school's varsity baseball team. Loomis then enrolled at the University of Portland, to play college baseball for the Portland Pilots baseball team.

As a freshman at the University of Portland in 1990, Loomis had a .397 batting average, a .303 on-base percentage (OBP) and a .329 SLG.

As a sophomore in 1991, Loomis batted .397 with a .668 SLG, 10 home runs, and 53 RBIs.

In the 1992 season as a junior, Loomis hit 11 home runs, 22 doubles, 1 triple and 56 RBIs. He was named First Team All-Pac-10 Conference and the Pac-10 Player of the Year.

Professional career
Loomis was drafted in the 31st round by the Oakland Athletics in the 1992 Major League Baseball draft.

Loomis began his professional career with the Southern Oregon A's of the Class A Northwest League, where he batted .254 with five home runs. He returned to the Southern Oregon A's in 1993. He hit .247 with three home runs for Southern Oregon.

Coaching career
On June 10, 2015, Loomis was hired as the head coach of Portland.

Head coaching record

See also
 List of current NCAA Division I baseball coaches

References

External links

Pacific Lutheran Lutes bio
Portland Pilots bio

Living people
1970 births
Baseball second basemen
Baseball third basemen
Portland Pilots baseball players
Southern Oregon A's players
George Fox Bruins baseball coaches
High school baseball coaches in the United States
Pacific Lutheran Lutes baseball coaches
Portland Pilots baseball coaches
Sportspeople from Oregon City, Oregon
Pacific University alumni